Max Loong is an actor and TV host.

Swiss entertainment magazine Schweizer Illustrierte ranked him as one of the top 100 most important and influential Swiss personalities in 2007.

In the same year, Elle Magazine Singapore awarded him the ‘Breakout Star of the year’ award.
 
Among some of his most recognisable works, he has been the host of Musicstar, the Swiss equivalent of American Idol, and also filled a role as the lead character (Michael Wong) of Singapore's Emmy nominated comedy First Class.

TV career
At the age of 20, he beat more than 400 other competitors to become the host for the first Swiss music channel, VIVA Schweiz. This was his first foray into hosting.
 
Shows he has hosted in Europe include Fanta Fiesta (teleprompter), McMusic (requestshow), FreaX (gameshow), Popschau (newsshow), Sunrise (latenightshow) and his own produced hit show Interaktiv (liveshow) where he has interviewed famous artistes such as Britney Spears, Mariah Carey, Usher, 50 Cent, Alicia Keys,  Robert Downey Jr. and Pierce Brosnan to name a few.
 
He has also hosted MTV Southeast Asia, "MTV Mobbed" Gamepad (gameshow), Pop 10 (chartshow), Pop Inc. (life-style show) and red carpet coverage of the MTV Asia Awards 2006 in Bangkok (Thailand).
 
In 2007, Max was chosen as the Musicstar host, which is the Swiss equivalent of American Idol.
 
In 2008 and 2009, Max Loong also hosted reality- and entertainment shows such as the S-Factor and Mitsubishi Challenge.
In 2009, he signed on for the 4th season of MusicStar in Switzerland.

Film career
In 2003 he has acted in leading roles on the big screen in Swiss movies such as in “Piff Paff Puff”, a movie about gangsters with different racial backgrounds, playing the role of a drug addict.
 
While in Snow White, a film about the high society party scene of Zurich, being a DJ, and in his controversial hit movie Breakout, a movie about violent kids locked up in a Swiss youth jail, he took up the role as a rapist, playing his most challenging character so far.
 
He also had a television drama series named after him, Adventure Max. He appeared in the first two seasons of the French television series Deja Vu and other television shows.
 
Loong landed a starring role in the Asian dramedy series After Hours, which ran for 13 episodes.
He starred in Singapore's Emmy nominated number 1 comedy series First Class (season 1&2) as a young teacher at a dysfunctional school and the 2010 drama “Perfect Deception”.

Filmography

Actor

Host

Awards
 Elle Breakout Star of The Year 2007

References

External links

1980 births
Living people